Maguire University is a fictitious college invented in 1963 by a group of Chicago high school basketball coaches, for the sole purpose of securing tickets to the NCAA Final Four.

History
The idea was hatched by then-Fenwick High School coach Len Tyrrell at Maguire's Pub in Forest Park, Illinois. The NCAA fell for it, and so did at least one real school: the United States Air Force Academy, which contacted Tyrrell (Maguire's self-proclaimed "Chancellor") and asked to play his nonexistent team.

Maguire (nicknamed "the Jollymen") received Final Four tickets for two years, until Bill Jauss wrote about the scam in the Chicago Tribune. The NCAA was not amused. The coaches then had to acquire their own tickets, and at least one of them has attended every Final Four (or, as they call it, Final Five) ever since. Maguire's motto, "We Play Hurt", is a reference to the hangovers accrued by Maguire's "students".

Terrell grew the faux-university's "enrollment" from the original eight members to well over 150 in the thirty-plus years he ran the phony school. He was also named Maguire's first Hall of Fame member, after resigning his position in 2000. Kelly's Pub, on Webster Street in Chicago, serves as the college's "campus" since the closing of Maguire's Pub in 1988.

For the 2018 Final Four (which featured Loyola University Chicago, the first [real] Chicago-based team to make the Final Four since DePaul in 1979), the Jollymen were based at the Drury Plaza Hotel in San Antonio.

See also
 Plainfield Teacher's College

References

Further reading

External links
Official site

Forest Park, Illinois
Fictional universities and colleges
Hoaxes in the United States
1960s hoaxes
1962–63 in American college basketball